Cutter is a surname. The name comes from the occupation of cloth cutter, and was Latinised as Cissor.

Notable people with the surname include:
Ammi Ruhamah Cutter (minister) (1705–1746), American minister
Benjamin Cutter (1857–1910), American composer
Bowman Cutter, American economist, political thinker and businessman
Carrie Cutter, fictional DC comic book villain Cupid (comics)
Charles Ammi Cutter (1837–1903), American librarian
Elizabeth Cutter (1929–2010), Scottish professor
Ephraim Cutter (1832–1917), American physician
George W. Cutter (born 1849, date of death unknown), American sailor
George Washington Cutter (died 1865), American poet
Irving Samuel Cutter, American doctor, teacher of medicine and medical journalist
Kiki Cutter (born 1949), American alpine ski racer
Kirtland Cutter (1860–1939), American architect
Leonard R. Cutter (1825–1894), American politician
Lise Cutter (born 1959), American actress
Murray Cutter (1902-1983) American orchestrator
Slade Cutter (1911–2005), American naval officer
Stephanie Cutter (born 1968), American political consultant
William Richard Cutter (1847–1918), American historian and genealogist

Jack Isaac Cutter (2001-onwards), American descendant. Junior Detective.

References